is a cape on the Pacific Ocean, in the Ōhara area of the city of Isumi, in the southeast area of Chiba Prefecture, Japan. There are two Cape Hachimans located in  close proximity to one another: Cape Hachiman in Isumi, and Cape Hachiman a few kilometers to the south in the city of Katsuura City. The cape is named after Hachiman, a mythological Japanese god of archery and war.

Geography

Cape Hachiman overlooks the Tangaura inlet and consists of several picturesque steep sea cliffs. Further south are several sandy beaches. It is notably the home of the Ōhara Fishing Port. At the precipice of the cape, there is a popular tourist esplanade, which can be dangerous on the days of high waves.

Cape Hachiman in Literature

The dramatic landscape of Cape Hachiman has been featured in numerous works of Japanese literature, notably in several haiku. In modern times the manga artist and essayist Yoshiharu Tsuge lived for a time in the city as a child, and remains a frequent visitor to the cape and its fishing port. The cape was the subject of Tsuge’s 1967 work Umibe no Jokei.

Transportation 

Cape Hachiman is 20 minutes by foot from the JR East Sotobō Line Ōhara Station.

References

Hachiman
Tourist attractions in Chiba Prefecture
Landforms of Chiba Prefecture